The U.S. Coast Guard Training Center (TRACEN) in Yorktown, Virginia is one of eight major Coast Guard training facilities in the United States. The others are Training Center Petaluma, Training Center Cape May, Aviation Training Center, located in Mobile, Alabama, Leadership Development Center, located in New London, Connecticut, Maritime Law Enforcement Academy, located in Charleston, South Carolina, Special Missions Training Center, Camp LeJeune, North Carolina and the Aviation Technical Training Center, located in Elizabeth City, North Carolina. TRACEN Cape May is the only U.S. Coast Guard Base used for Basic Military Training or "boot camp". TRACEN Yorktown, TRACEN Petaluma, Maritime Law Enforcement Academy, and the Aviation Technical Training Center are locations for Coast Guard's apprentice level "A" and advanced level "C" Schools.

TRACEN Yorktown history
In 1917, The U.S. Navy purchased 400,000 acres of the Yorktown peninsula to serve as a fuel depot. In 1942 the U.S. Navy housed their Mine Warfare Training School on the land. The U.S. Coast Guard took possession of the school in 1957 and established the Reserve Training Center or RTC. The purpose of the RTC was to become the home of Coast Guard Officer Candidate School RTC was moved to the U.S. Coast Guard Academy in New London, CT in 1998. RTC was formerly a large summer training program for reservists. In 1998 the command was renamed Training Center Yorktown.

Training
Training at TRACEN Yorktown is extensive. The training is designed to instill a profound understanding of technical and leadership skills in order to perform duties in a leadership role as a Petty Officer. The duration of "A" School training is typically 10 to 19 weeks depending on the course. Permanently assigned personnel include active duty, reserve, and civilian instructional, curriculum design and support staff. Students include Coast Guard active duty, reservists, and auxiliarists. Additionally, TRACEN Yorktown provides training to other U.S. military services and agencies, and foreign military and coast guard personnel.

"A" Schools
"A" School is an entry level training course in a particular rating.
The U.S. Coast Guard offers seven "A" school courses at TRACEN Yorktown. 
 Intelligence Specialist
 Gunner's Mate
 Electrician's Mate
 Boatswain's Mate
 Marine Science Technician
 Machinery Technician
 Damage Controlman

International training
The U.S. Coast Guard offers opportunities for foreign Coast Guard members to experience U.S. military training. This training enhances military skills and advances technical understanding. The international training course is 15 weeks long.

Base services
The Coast Guard is unique in that all other military branches have large bases with many services. The Coast Guard has many small stations that do not have those services. However, there are a few bases that the Coast Guard operate with all the services that other branches have on their bases. TRACEN Yorktown is one of those bases.

The Training Center has a number of services:
 Auto Hobby Shop
 Barber Shop
 Chapel
 Clinic
 Credit Union
 Cyber Cafe
 Dry Cleaner
 Coast Guard Exchange
 Dining Facility
 Gym
 Subway
 Movie theater
 All hands club

Reporting
All students reporting to TRACEN Yorktown will receive instruction on base policies during indoctrination and must follow the instructions provided on their official orders. "C" School students will report to Lafayette or Cain Hall, depending on their paygrade, for room assignments.

External links
 Training Center Yorktown official website

References

United States Coast Guard schools and training
Military installations in Virginia
York County, Virginia
Buildings and structures in York County, Virginia
Education in York County, Virginia
Educational institutions established in 1957
1957 establishments in Virginia